Wrestlers from the United States have taken part in most of the major men's freestyle wrestling competitions over the years, in particular the Olympic Games and FILA Wrestling World Championships. Men's freestyle wrestling competition began in the Olympics in 1904. FILA began holding World Championships in men's freestyle in 1951. During Olympic years, FILA suspends the World Championships. The United States did not send wrestlers to the championships in 1951, 1957, 1959, 1980, and 2002. No official team standings are kept for the Olympics. Some team finishes are approximate.

Olympics and World Championships

1904

1908

1920

1924–1936

1948–1968

1969–1996

1997–2001

2002–2013

2014–2017

2018–

World Cups

Team Titles and Results
The tables shows the team results and titles for World Championships, World Cups, and Olympic Games.

Multiple-time gold medalists
The tables shows American male wrestlers who have won at least 2 gold medals at the World Championships or Olympic Games. Boldface denotes active wrestlers and highest medal count among all wrestlers (including these who not included in these tables) per type.

Statistics

Medalists by weight, 1904–2016

Medalists by era

Average performances by era

Notes

See also

USA Wrestling
Wrestling in the United States
United States results in Greco-Roman wrestling
United States results in women's freestyle wrestling
Soviet and Russian results in men's freestyle wrestling
List of World and Olympic Champions in men's freestyle wrestling
List of Cadet, Junior, and Espoir World Champions in men's freestyle wrestling
Iranian results in men's freestyle wrestling

References
 FILA Database
USA Wrestling Olympic Team History
USA Wrestling World Team History

United States Freestyle Mens
Wrestling in the United States
Freestyle wrestling